Captain Pamphile or The Adventures of Captain Pamphile (French: Le Capitaine Pamphile) is an 1839 French adventure novel by Alexandre Dumas. It was aimed at children and had a strong anti-slavery message. It was translated into English in 1850.

References

Bibliography
 Marcel Dorigny. The Abolitions of Slavery: From Lʹeger Fʹelcitʹe Sonthonax to Victor Schoelcher, 1793, 1794, 1848. Berghahn Books, 2003.

1839 French novels
Novels by Alexandre Dumas